Peachland is a district municipality in British Columbia with a population of approximately 6,000.

Peachland may also refer to:
 Peachland, North Carolina, United States, a village in North Carolina with a ~400 from 2010 (the latest year for which population statistics are available).